Notobryon is a genus of nudibranchs. They are marine gastropod molluscs in the family Scyllaeidae.

Species
The following species are recognised in the genus Notobryon:
 Notobryon bijecurum Baba, 1937
 Notobryon caribbaeum Caballer & Ortea, 2014 
 Notobryon clavigerum Baba, 1937
 Notobryon panamicum Pola, Camacho-Garcia & Gosliner, 2012
 Notobryon thompsoni Pola, Camacho-Garcia & Gosliner, 2012
 Notobryon wardi Odhner, 1936

References

  Pola M., Camacho-Garcia Y.E. & Gosliner T.M. (2012) Molecular data illuminate cryptic nudibranch species: the evolution of the Scyllaeidae (Nudibranchia: Dendronotina) with a revision of Notobryon. Zoological Journal of the Linnean Society 165: 311–336

External links 
 http://www.seaslugforum.net/notoward.htm

Scyllaeidae